The 1851 California gubernatorial election was held on September 3, 1851, to elect the governor of California.

During the 1851 convention, the Democratic Party refused to renominate incumbent John McDougall as the party's choice for governor. Instead, state Democrats nominated Assembly Speaker John Bigler.

Results

References

1851
California
gubernatorial
September 1851 events